Moccia is an Italian surname. Notable people with the surname include:

Federico Moccia (born 1963), Italian writer, screenwriter and film director, son of Giuseppe
Giuseppe Moccia (1933–2006), Italian screenwriter and film director
Mario Moccia (born 1967), American athletic director
Richard A. Moccia, mayor of Norwalk, Connecticut (2005–2013)
Rocío Sánchez Moccia (born 1988), Argentine field hockey player

Italian-language surnames